Culpeper County is a county located along the borderlands of the northern and central region of the Commonwealth of Virginia. As of the 2020 United States Census, the population was 52,552. Its county seat and only incorporated community is Culpeper.

Culpeper County is included in the Washington–Baltimore–Arlington, DC–MD–VA–WV–PA Combined Statistical Area.

History
At the time of European encounter, the inhabitants of future Culpeper County were a Siouan-speaking sub-group of the Manahoac tribe called the Tegninateo. Culpeper County was established in 1749, with territory partitioned from Orange County. The county is named for Thomas Colepeper, 2nd Baron Colepeper, colonial governor of Virginia from 1677 to 1683.

In May 1749, the first Culpeper Court convened in the home of Robert Tureman, near the present location of the Town of Culpeper. In July 1749, Tureman commissioned 17-year-old George Washington as the first County surveyor. One of his first duties was to lay out the county's courthouse complex, which included the courthouse, jail, stocks, gallows and accessory buildings. By 1752 the complex stood at the present northeast corner of Davis and Main Streets. The courthouse village was named Town of Fairfax for Thomas Fairfax, 6th Lord Fairfax of Cameron (1693–1781).

During the Virginia convention held in May 1775, the colony was divided into sixteen districts. Each district had instructions to raise a battalion of men "to march at a minute's notice." Culpeper, Orange and Fauquier, forming one district, raised 350 men in "Clayton's old field" on the Catalpa estate; they were called the Culpeper Minute Men. In December, the Minute Men, marching under their flag depicting a rattlesnake and inscribed with the words "Liberty or Death" and "Don't Tread on Me", took part in the Battle of Great Bridge, the first Revolutionary battle on Virginia soil. The Culpeper Minute Men reorganized in 1860 in response to the impending Civil War and became part of 13th Infantry's Company B, fighting against the US Government forces. The Culpeper Minutemen were again organized for World War I, and joined the 116th Infantry.

In 1833, based on the county's growing population and the need of those in the northwestern area for easier access to a county seat, the upper 267 square miles (692 km2) of Culpeper County was partitioned off to create Rappahannock County, Virginia, which was founded by an act of the Virginia General Assembly.

During the Civil War the Battle of Cedar Mountain took place on 9 August 1862, and the Battle of Brandy Station occurred on 9 June 1863, in Culpeper County.

Culpeper was the boyhood home of Civil War General A. P. Hill, who fought against Union forces.

The negative impact of the Massive Resistance campaign against school integration led to the statewide election of a pro-desegregation governor. By the middle of the 1970s, Culpeper was the last county in Virginia to desegregate its public schools. In 2018 Culpeper County Public Schools has six elementary, two middle schools and two high schools. In 1935 the Rotary Club of Culpeper began a college loan fund, which in 1966 became a four-year scholarship based on academic achievement. The group also provides a Technical School scholarship based on academic achievement.

Culpeper County is home to Commonwealth Park, site for many world-class equestrian events. It was here that actor Christopher Reeve suffered his 1995 accident during a competition.

The town of Culpeper was rated #10 by Norman Crampton, author of "The 100 Best Small Towns in America," in February, 1993.

In April 2016, the county Board of Supervisors denied a routine request from the Islamic Center of Culpeper for a pump and haul permit to serve their envisioned mosque. This resulted in a lawsuit by the US Department of Justice in December.

Economy
Culpeper County has a civilian workforce of 24,313. 30% of residents live and work within the county while 70% of workers commute out of the locality. The most residents are commuting to Fairfax or Fauqier counties. In comparison, the equivalent of 45% are in-commuters. The most in-commuters are coming from Orange County.

The Top 10 non-governmental Culpeper employers as of March 2021:
 Culpeper Memorial Hospital
 Walmart
 S.W.I.F.T.
 Merillat Industries
 Cintas Corporation
 Continental Automotive
 Culpeper Health and Rehabilitation Center
 Virginia Baptist Homes
 Bingham and Taylor Corporation
 Childhelp

Geography

The northeast border of Culpeper County is defined by the Rappahannock River which flows east-southeastward along its border, while the south border of the county is similarly defined by the meanders of the Rapidan River. The Hazel River flows eastward through the county, discharging into the Rappahannock on the county's east border, while the Thornton River also flows eastward through the county, discharging into the Hazel in the north part of the county. The county is in the foothills of the Blue Ridge Mountains, which are quickly accessed beginning with Old Rag Mountain and the Skyline Drive just up Route 522. The rolling hills generally slope to the south and east, with its highest point near its west corner at 705' (215m) ASL.

Major highways

Adjacent counties

 Fauquier County - north
 Stafford County – east
 Spotsylvania County - southeast
 Orange County – south
 Madison County – southwest
 Rappahannock County – northwest

Protected areas
 Brandy Station Battlefield Park
 Mountain Run Lake Park

Lakes

 Balds Run Reservoir
 Brandy Rock Farm Lake
 Caynor Lake
 Lake Pelham
 Merrimac/Mountain Run Lake

Government

Board of Supervisors
 Catalpa District: Sue D. Hansohn (R)
 Cedar Mountain District: C. Jack Frazier (I)
 East Fairfax District: Steven L. Walker (R)
 Jefferson District: Brad C. Rosenberger (R)
 Salem District: Alexa V. Fritz (R)
 Stevensburg District: William C. Chase, Jr. Vice Chairman (I)
 West Fairfax District: Gary M. Deal (R)

 Clerk of the Circuit Court: Carson Beard (I)
 Commissioner of the Revenue: Terry L. Yowell (I)
 Commonwealth's Attorney: Paul R. Walther (R)
 Sheriff: Scott H. Jenkins (I)
 Treasurer: David L. Dejarnette (R)

Culpeper County is represented by Republicans Bryce E. Reeves, Emmett W. Hanger, Jr., and Jill Holtzman Vogel in the Virginia Senate, Republicans Michael J. Webert and Edward T. Scott in the Virginia House of Delegates, and Democrat Abigail Spanberger in the U.S. House of Representatives.

Culpeper County has been a Republican precinct for several decades. In only one national election since 1948 has the county selected the Democratic Party candidate (as of 2020).

Procurement
Recent media investigations regarding law enforcement procurement of military equipment through the "1033" program offered by the Defense Logistics Agency identified Culpeper County as having received, as donations, a "Mine Resistant Vehicle" in 2013 worth $412,000 and 20 night-vision optics worth an additional $136,000.00.

Demographics

2020 census

Note: the US Census treats Hispanic/Latino as an ethnic category. This table excludes Latinos from the racial categories and assigns them to a separate category. Hispanics/Latinos can be of any race.

2000 census
As of the 2000 United States Census, there were 34,262 people, 12,141 households, and 9,045 families in the county. The population density was 90.4/sqmi (34.9/km2). There were 12,871 housing units at an average density of 34.0/sqmi (13.1/km2). The racial makeup of the county was 68.27% White, 28.15% Black or African American, 0.33% Native American, 0.66% Asian, 0.01% Pacific Islander, 1.15% from other races, and 1.43% from two or more races. 2.50% of the population were Hispanic or Latino of any race.

There were 12,141 households, out of which 35.00% had children under the age of 18 living with them, 58.50% were married couples living together, 11.30% had a female householder with no husband present, and 25.50% were non-families. 20.60% of all households were made up of individuals, and 7.90% had someone living alone who was 65 years of age or older. The average household size was 2.68 and the average family size was 3.08.

The county population contained 25.70% under the age of 18, 8.10% from 18 to 24, 31.10% from 25 to 44, 23.30% from 45 to 64, and 11.90% who were 65 years of age or older. The median age was 36 years. For every 100 females, there were 103.30 males. For every 100 females age 18 and over, there were 103.20 males.

The median income for a household in the county was $45,290, and the median income for a family was $51,475. Males had a median income of $36,621 versus $25,985 for females. The per capita income for the county was $20,162. About 27.00% of families and 29.20% of the population were below the poverty line, including 38.30% of those under age 18 and 28.60% of those age 65 or over.

Education
Culpeper County Public Schools

Elementary schools

 A.G. Richardson Elementary
 Culpeper Christian
 Emerald Hill Elementary
 Epiphany Catholic School
 Farmington Elementary
 Pearl Sample Elementary
 Sycamore Park Elementary
 Yowell Elementary

Middle schools
 Culpeper Christian
 Culpeper Middle
 Floyd T. Binns Middle

High schools
 Culpeper County High School
 Eastern View High School
 Culpeper Technical Education Center

Communities

Town
 Culpeper

Unincorporated communities

 Alanthus
 Boston
 Brandy Station
 Buena
 Cardova
 Catalpa
 Eggbornsville
 Eldorada
 Elkwood
 Griffinsburg
 Jeffersonton
 Kellys Ford
 Lagrange
 Lignum
 Mitchells
 Rapidan
 Reva
 Richardsville
 Rixeyville
 Stevensburg
 Wakefield
 Waterloo
 Winston

Notable people

 Kenny Alphin - (b. 1963) country music singer
 Thomas Colepeper - Governor of Virginia Colony (1677-1683)
 Pete Hill - (1882-1951) professional baseball player, in Hall of Fame
 Dangerfield Newby - (c.1820-October 17, 1859), one of John Brown's men killed in the raid on the federal armory at Harper's Ferry, VA
 Eppa Rixey - (1891-1963) professional baseball player, in Hall of Fame
 D. French Slaughter, Jr. - US Congressman (1985-1991)
 Andrew Stevenson – Speaker of the House of Representatives
 French Strother - (1730-1800) significant political figure in early national history

See also
 National Register of Historic Places listings in Culpeper County, Virginia

References

External links

 Culpeper County Government
 Culpeper County Public Schools
 Culpeper Regional Hospital 
 Culpeper Chamber of Commerce
 Culpeper County During the Civil War in Encyclopedia Virginia